In law, void means of no legal effect.  An action, document, or transaction which is void is of no legal effect whatsoever: an absolute nullity—the law treats it as if it had never existed or happened. The term void ab initio, which means "to be treated as invalid from the outset", comes from adding the Latin phrase ab initio (from the beginning) as a qualifier.  For example, in many jurisdictions where a person signs a contract under duress, that contract is treated as being void ab initio. The frequent combination "null and void" is a legal doublet.

The term is frequently used in contradistinction to the term "voidable" and "unenforceable".

Definitions
Black's Law Dictionary defines 'void' as:

In the case of a contract, this means there is no legal obligation, therefore there can be no breach of contract since the contract is null, but there may be an implied contract which requires the recipient of goods or services provided to pay their reasonable value.

Black's Dictionary further goes on to define 'void ab initio as:

In practical terms, 'void' is usually used in contradistinction to 'voidable' and 'unenforceable', the principal difference being that an action which is voidable remains valid until it is avoided.

Significance
The significance of this usually lies in the possibility of third party rights being acquired in good faith.  For example, in Cundy v Lindsay (1878), a fraudster using the name Blenkarn posed as a retailer and induced Lindsay & Co to deliver 250 dozen linen handkerchiefs to him. Blenkarn then sold the handkerchiefs on to an innocent third party, Cundy, but Lindsay was never paid. Lindsay, claiming ownership of the handkerchiefs, sued Cundy for their return. If the contract of sale to Blenkarn was held to be voidable for fraud, then Lindsay & Co would only have recourse against the insolvent Blenkarn. However, if (as was held) the contract of sale was void ab initio, then the title did not pass from Lindsay to Blenkarn in the first place, and Lindsay could claim back the handkerchiefs from Cundy as their property. Cundy was left with only a claim against the insolvent Blenkarn.

In every case, third parties involved with bad faith in void or voidable contracts not only are affected by nullity, but may also be liable for statutory damages.

However, the right to avoid a voidable transaction can be lost (usually lost by delay). These are sometimes referred to as "bars to rescission". Such considerations do not apply to matters affected by absolute nullity, or void ab initio.

See also
 Legal nullity

References

Legal terminology
Contract law